The Selati Game Reserve is protected wildlife area situated between the towns of Gravelotte and Phalaborwa, in the Limpopo province of South Africa, the reserve has an area of about 30,000 ha.

The most endangered Lillie cycad, listed under CITES Appendix I, occurs in its hills, and an application for strip mining is seen as a threat.

See also 
 Protected areas of South Africa

References

Nature reserves in South Africa